William Scott Wilson (born 1944, Nashville, Tennessee) is known for translating several works of Japanese literature, mostly those relating to the martial tradition of that country.
Wilson has brought historical Chinese and Japanese thought, philosophy, and tactics to the West in his translations of famous East Asian literature.

Awards 
On November 3, 2015, Wilson was inducted into the Order of the Rising Sun, Gold Rays with Rosette, for "promoting understanding of Japan through the introduction of Japanese Literature in the United States."

Wilson received Japan's Foreign Minister's Commendation from the Consulate General of Japan in Miami, Masakazu Toshikage on November 15, 2005. According to the Consulate Press release: 
The award is "conferred upon individuals or groups that have rendered especially distinguished service in strengthening the relationship between Japan and other countries.  Through his literary works and translations, Mr. Wilson has contributed greatly to increased cultural understanding and friendship between the US and Japan."

His first original work, The Lone Samurai: The Life of Miyamoto Musashi, was published in 2004.  He has done extensive research on Japanese philosophy and Bushido, the way of the samurai."

Timeline
 Bachelor of Arts in Political Science, Dartmouth College
 Bachelor of Arts, Japanese Language and Literature, Monterey Institute of Foreign Studies, Monterey, California, USA (Now Monterey Institute of International Studies, a graduate school of Middlebury College)
 Aichi Prefectural University, Nagoya, Japan (1975–1977) extensive Study of Edo period (1603–1868)
 Master's Degree in Japanese Language and Literature, University of Washington at Seattle. (1979)

Books
The Lone Samurai: The Life of Miyamoto Musashi, Kodansha International (October, 2004) 
 ‘’Walking the Kiso Road’’ Shambhala Publications, 2015 
 ‘’The Life and Zen Haiku Poetry of Santoka Taneda Tuttle Publishing, 2021

Translations
 ‘’Afoot in Japan’’ by Yasumi Roan. 2015 
 Tao Te Ching: A New Translation by Lao Tzu, Shambhala Publications, 2012 
 The Unencumbered Spirit: Reflections of a Chinese Sage. Kodansha International 
 Yojokun: Life Lessons from a Samurai (The Way of the Warrior Series) by Kaibara Ekiken (January 1, 2009) Kodansha International 224 pages 
 The 36 Secret Strategies of the Martial Arts by Hiroshi Moriya (March, 2008)
 The Demon's Sermon on the Martial Arts by Issai Chozanshi. Kodansha International (release date: November, 2006) 
 The Flowering Spirit: Classic Teachings on the Art of No by Zeami. Kodansha (release date: May 19, 2006) 
 The Life-Giving Sword: Secret Teachings from the House of the Shogun (The Living Sword) by Yagyu Munenori (February, 2004)
 Go Rin no Sho (The Book of Five Rings) by Miyamoto Musashi (01/18/2002)
 Taiko: An Epic Novel of War and Glory in Feudal Japan by Eiji Yoshikawa (10/27/2000)
 The Unfettered Mind by Takuan Sōhō (12/01/1987)
 Budoshinshu: The Warrior's Primer by Daidōji Yuzan (04/01/1984)
 Hagakure (Hidden by Leaves) by Yamamoto Tsunetomo (03/01/1983)
 Ideals of the Samurai: Writings of Japanese Warriors (October, 1982)
 Roots of Wisdom (Saikontan) (1984)

Notes

External links
 Honored by the Consulate General of Japan, November, 2005
 Miami Herald Biography, November 20, 2005
 University of Washington
 Asia Times Book Review of "The 36 Secret Strategies of the Martial Arts" March 15, 2008
 Publishers Weekly Interview  Revisits an Ancient Culture (6/12/2004)
 Sean Michael Wilson's homepage - includes manga/graphic novel versions of William Scott Wilson's books.

Japanese–English translators
1944 births
Living people